"The Waltz of the Wind" is a song recorded by Hank Williams.  It was written by Fred Rose.  Williams recorded it as a demo in 1948 or 1949 in Shreveport alone with his guitar and it was released as a posthumous single by MGM Records in 1957.

References

Hank Williams songs
1957 singles
1949 songs
Songs written by Fred Rose (songwriter)
MGM Records singles